The following is a  list of women architects by nationality – notable women who are well known for their work in the field of architecture.

Africa

Egypt
 Shahira Fahmy (born 1974), founded her own firm in 2005

Kenya 
 Eugenie Dorothy Hughes (1910–1987), first Kenyan and first East African female architect
 Erica Mann (1917–2007), town planner and architect, Architect Laureate
 Emma Miloyo (born 1981), partner in Design Source in Nairobi, first female President of the Architectural Association of Kenya (AAK)

Niger 
Mariam Kamara (born 1979), Nigerien and founder of the architecture and research firm Atelier Masomi

Nigeria 
 Olajumoke Adenowo (born 1968), described as "the face of architecture in Nigeria"
 Fifi Ejindu, architect, businesswoman, philanthropist

South Africa
 Sarah Calburn (born 1964), own practice, residential projects and Johannesburg's Gallery MOMO
 Sophia Gray (1814–1871), first female architect in South Africa
 Linda Mvusi (born c. 1955), actress, the architect, owns her own firm
 Kate Otten (born 1964), own practice, community libraries, the waterfront development at Tzaneen
 Anya van der Merwe, Cape Town architect
 Nadia Tromp (born 1977), own practice, healthcare clinics, residential homes and community centres

Uganda
 Assumpta Nnaggenda-Musana (born 1970), architect, urban planner and academic

Zambia
 Denise Scott Brown (born 1931), born in Northern Rhodesia; educated in South Africa and London; lives and works in the US

Asia

Armenia
 Anna Ter-Avetikian (1908–2013), first Armenian woman to become an architect
 Tamar Tumanyan (1907–1989), Soviet Armenian architect

Azerbaijan
 Gulnara Mehmandarova (born 1959), researcher in connection with UNESCO sites

Bangladesh
 Khaleda Ekram (1950–2016), architect, educator, researcher
Marina Tabassum

China
 Huang Hui
 Lin Huiyin (1904–1955), first known Chinese female architect
 Jing Liu (born 1981), co-founder of the New York design office SO-IL
 Lu Wenyu, whose husband Wang Shu won the Priztker Prize for the work the duo completed together in their firm (and whose sole attribution of the prize generated some controversy)

India
 Eulie Chowdhury (1923–1995), the first woman to qualify as an architect in Asia
 Shimul Javeri Kadri (born 1962), own firm in Mumbai
 Revathi Kamath (1955–2020), pioneer of mud architecture
 Anupama Kundoo (born 1967), innovative architect working in Auroville
 Pravina Mehta (c.1924–c.1990), urban planner and architect
 Perin Jamsetjee Mistri (1913–1989), believed to be the first woman to graduate in architecture in India
 Sheila Sri Prakash (born 1955), first woman in India to have started her own architectural firm
 Sonali Rastogi (born 1967), founding partner of Morphogenesis
 Samira Rathod (born 1963), architect, furniture designer, educator, own partnership since 1995
 Gira Sarabhai, apprenticed under Frank Lloyd Wright and established National Institute of Design, Ahmedabad
 Brinda Somaya (born 1949), UNESCO prize for restoring St. Thomas Cathedral, Mumbai
 Chitra Vishwanath, established her own firm in 1991, working in India and Africa

Indonesia 
 Elora Hardy (born 1980) is a Canadian-Indonesian architect who uses bamboo.

Iran
 Farshid Moussavi (born 1965), Iranian-British founder of Farshid Moussavi Architecture
 Nasrine Seraji (born 1957), Iranian-British founder of Atelier Searaji Architects & head of Department of Architecture, University of Hong Kong

Iraq
 Dame Zaha Hadid (1950–2016), Iraqi-British; founder of Zaha Hadid Architects in London; first woman to win the Pritzker Prize

Israel
Lotte Cohn (1898–1983), German born; pioneering figure in Israeli architecture
Dora Gad (1912–2003), influential interior designer
 Ada Karmi-Melamede (born 1936), Supreme Court of Israel, numerous educational buildings
Nitza Metzger-Szmuk (born 1945), conservation work in Tel Aviv
Shulamit Nadler (1923–2016), designed National Library of Israel and Jerusalem Theatre
 Rivka Oxman, academic

Japan
Itsuko Hasegawa (born 1941), own firm since 1979
Masako Hayashi (1928–2001), first woman to win Architectural Institute of Japan Award
Toshiko Mori (born 1951), first woman to receive tenure at Harvard GSD
Nobuko Nakahara (1929–2008), founded PODOKO, association of female architects
 Kazuyo Sejima (born 1956), co-founder of SANAA, Pritzker prize winner in 2010
Nobuko Tsuchiura (1900–1998), first woman architect in Japan

Jordan
 Abeer Seikaly (born 1979)

Lebanon 
 Amale Andraos (born 1972/1973), dean of the Columbia Graduate School of Architecture, Planning and Preservation

Mongolia 
 Biambasuren Luvsandamdingiin (born 1955), urban planner

Nepal
Hisila Yami (born 1959), also a government minister

Pakistan
 Yasmeen Lari (born circa 1941), the country's first female architect

Palestine
 Suad Amiry (born 1951), author and architect
 Khouloud Daibes (born 1965), architect and former politician and diplomat

Saudi Arabia
 Nadia Bakhurji, interior architect, holds several administrative positions

Singapore 
 Cheong Koon Hean (born 1957), award-winning urban planner and architect

Sri Lanka
 Minnette de Silva (1918–1998), first Sri Lankan female architect

Taiwan
 Xiu Zelan (1925–2016), Taiwan's first female architect

Thailand
 Patama Roonrakwit, practising architect, focus on under-privileged housing

Turkey
 Altuğ Çinici (born 1935)
Mualla Eyüboğlu (1919–2009)
 Zeynep Fadıllıoğlu (born 1955), redesigned Istanbul's Şakirin Mosque to wide international acclaim

Australasia

Australia
 Lily Isabel Maude Addison (1885–1968), early female architect in Queensland
 Ruth Alsop (1879–1976), first woman qualified as an architect in the state of Victoria
 Brit Andresen, Norwegian-born, first woman in Australia to be awarded the RAIA Gold Medal
Emma Appleton, Australian landscape architect and urban designer
Beverley Bolin (born 1923), the first woman to become a registered architect in South Australia.
 Eva Buhrich (1915–1976), architect, editor and writer who migrated from Germany
 Karen Burns (born 1962), architectural historian, theorist, activist and educator
 Stroma Buttrose (1929–2020), first female Planning Assistant in South Australia
 Kerry Clare, architect and joint recipient of the Australian Institute of Architects Gold Medal
 Justine Clark, New Zealand-born architectural editor, writer, speaker and researcher
 Louise Cox (born 1939), architect, Officer of the Order of Australia for services to architecture
 Eleanor Cullis-Hill (1913–2001), Sydney architect
 Suzanne Dance, Melbourne-based architect
 Maggie Edmond (born 1946), principal at Melbourne-based Edmond and Corrigan
 Rosina Edmunds (1900–1956), architect, urban planner and writer
 Harriet Edquist (born 1940s), architectural historian, educator and writer
 Zahava Elenberg (born 1973), co-director of Elenberg Fraser
 Cassandra Fahey (born circa 1972), architect and interior designer
 Elizabeth Farrelly (born 1957), architecture critic, author and columnist
 Margaret Feilman (1921–2013), Perth architect and town planner
 Margaret Findlay (1916–2007), first female in Tasmania to qualify as an associate of the Royal Australian Institute of Architects
 Abbie Galvin (born 1970), principal of BVN Architecture
 Jill Garner, principal of Garner Davis, Associate Government Architect, Office of the Victorian Government Architect
 Eli Giannini (born 1956), architect; director of McGauran Giannini Soon; Life Fellow of the Australian Institute of Architects
 Eileen Good (1893–1986), Australia's first female architecture academic
 Elizabeth Grant (born 1963), architectural anthropologist, research in indigenous architecture
 Kristin Green, director of KGA Architecture
 Marion Mahony Griffin (1871–1961), one of the first registered female architects in the world
Winsome Hall Andrew (1905–1997)
 Laura Harding (born 1975), practitioner and critic
 Ellison Harvie (1902–1984), first Australian woman to graduate with a Diploma of Architectural Design; first female Fellow of the Royal Victorian Institute of Architects; first woman elected to an Australian Architectural Institute council; first Australian woman to become a partner in a large firm
 Beatrice Hutton (1893–1990), first female architect accepted into an Institute of Architects in Australia
 Sandra Kaji-O'Grady, professor and head of architecture at the University of Queensland
 Louise St John Kennedy (born 1950), practices in Claremont, Western Australia
 Helen Lochhead, architect and urban designer
 Ruth Lucas (1924–2001), works with her husband Bill Lucas, known for the Glass House in Castlecrag, New South Wales
 Kirsteen Mackay, South Australian Government architect
 Kooi-Ying Mah (born 1950), architect, designer, and principal of Kooi-Ying Architects
 Gill Matthewson, academic, researcher and architect
 Nellie McCredie (1903–1968), Australian architect and potter
 Alison Mears, dean of the School of Design Strategies at Parsons The New School for Design
 Margaret Pitt Morison (1900–1985), early female architect in Western Australia
 Elina Mottram (1903–1996), British-born, Queensland's first and longest practicing female architect
 Phyllis Murphy (1924–2004), architect known for the 1956 Olympic Pool in Melbourne (with John Murphy) along with conservation projects
 Andrea Nield (born 1951), founded Emergency Architects Australia
 Rachel Nolan (born 1974), a founding director of Kennedy Nolan, a Melbourne-based practice
 Ellice Nosworthy (1897–1972), early female architect in New South Wales
 Alexis Ord, architect, activist and Melbourne's first female Lord Mayor
 Shelley Penn (born 1965), architect, urbanist and advocate
 Christine Phillips, academic, architect, advocate
 Susan Phillips (born 1958), award-winning second-generation architect based in Adelaide
 Caroline Pidcock (born 1962), advocate of sustainable development, based in Sydney
 Kelly Rattigan, founder and managing director of Formworks Architecture
 Dimity Reed (born 1942), first female president of Royal Australian Institute of Architects (Victoria); founding member of the Association of Women in Architecture
Sarah Lynn Rees
 Louise St John Kennedy (born 1950), West Australian architect, recipient of the 1984 Robin Boyd Award
 Penelope Seidler (born 1938), director of Sydney-based Harry Seidler and associates
 Mary Turner Shaw (1906–1990), pioneering female architect
 Naomi Stead (born 1975), architectural academic, critic and writer
 Muriel Stott (1889–1985), probably the first woman with her own architectural firm in Australia
 Florence Mary Taylor (1879–1969), born in England but emigrated as a child; Australia's first qualified female architect
 Jennifer Taylor (1935–2015), architect, professor, critic and author
 Cynthia Teague MBE (1906–2007), pioneering Australian architect and public servant
 Kerstin Thompson (born 1965), Melbourne-based architect; professor of design at Victoria University of Wellington, New Zealand
 Yvonne von Hartel (born 1943), co-founder of the urban planning firm Peckvonhartel
 Suzannah Waldron, a founding director of the Melbourne-based architectural practice Searle x Waldron
 Cindy Walters (born 1963), active in London at Walters & Cohen
 Emma Young (born 1971), director of Phooey

New Zealand
 Kate Beath (1882–1979), probably the first female architect in New Zealand
 Gill Matthewson (fl. from 1984), architect, educator, writer
Megan Wraight (1961–2020), New Zealand landscape architect

Europe

Albania
 Valentina Pistoli (1928-1993), first Albanian female architect

Austria
 Maria Auböck (born 1951), architect, educator, specializing in landscape architecture
 Ella Briggs (1880–1977), early Austrian female architect and interior decorator
 Margarete Schütte-Lihotzky (1897–2000), first Austrian female architect
 Lilia Skala (1896–1994), graduated in and practiced architecture before becoming an actress in the United States
 Laura P. Spinadel (born 1958), principal at BUSarchitektur
 Silja Tillner (born 1960), principal at Architekten Tillner & Willinger
 Liane Zimbler (1892–1987), possibly the first European woman to graduate in architecture, in Austria; practiced in the United States from 1938 to age 90

Belarus
 Lyubow Usava (born 1921), state architect who helped restore the Minsk after WWII

Belgium
 Christine Conix (born 1955)
 Simone Guilissen (1916–1996), early female practitioner; built residential villas and a large sports centre
 Dita Roque-Gourary (1915–2010)

Bosnia and Herzegovina
 Dijana Alić (born 195?), architect and academic living in Australia
 Vesna Bugarski (1930–1992), first female architect in Bosnia-Herzegovina
 Selma Harrington (born 1955), interior design, president of the Architects' Council of Europe

Bulgaria
 Victoria Angelova (1902–1947), built the first modern, national art gallery in the Balkans
 Milka Bliznakov (1927–2010), founder of the International Archive of Women in Architecture
 Maria Luisa Doseva-Georgieva (1894–1975), the second licensed woman architect in Bulgaria (after Elena Markova, who did not practice after obtaining her license)
 Dina Stancheva (born 1925), 1985 recipient of the Gold Badge of the Bulgarian Union of Architects

Croatia
 Rajka Vali (1926–2011), also pop singer

Czech Republic
 Eva Jiřičná (born 1939), moved from Czechoslovakia to London in 1968
Věra Machoninová (born 1928)
 Milada Petříková-Pavlíková (1895–1985), first female architect in Czechoslovakia

Denmark
 Pia Bech Mathiesen (1962–2016), designer, executive, head of the Universe science amusement park
 Ellen Braae (born 1965), landscape architect, educator
 Karen Clemmensen (1917–2001), functionalist educational institutions
 Inger Exner (born 1926), partnership with her husband Johannes, churches and restoration
 Mette Kynne Frandsen (born 1960), CEO of Henning Larsen Architects
 Ragna Grubb (1903–1961), one of the first to have her own business
 Gunver Hansen (born 1943), architect specializing in lighting design
 Malene Hauxner (1942–2012), modernist landscape architecture
 Anna Maria Indrio (born 1943), architect with C. F. Møller
 Kristine Jensen (born 1956), landscape architect
 Helle Juul (born 1954), urban planning
 Bodil Kjær (born 1932), interior design and office furniture
 Hanne Kjærholm (1930–2009), own firm, professor at Danish Academy
 Signe Kongebro (born 1972), partner at Henning Larsen Architects with responsibility for sustainability
 Eva Koppel (1916–2006), Brutalist-style public buildings
 Mette Lange (graduated 1990), mobile schools for nomad children in Goa
 Dorte Mandrup-Poulsen (born 1961), own practice in Copenhagen
 Elna Møller (1913–1994), principal editor of Danmarks Kirker
 Lise Roel (born 1928), based in Halmstad, Sweden
 Lene Tranberg (born 1956), since 2000: high-profile buildings in Copenhagen
 Susanne Ussing (1940–1998), experimental approaches with new materials
 Lone Wiggers (born 1963), partner at C. F. Møller Architects

Estonia
 Yoko Alender (born 1979), architect, civil servant and politician
 Dora Gordine (1895–1991), Estonian-born sculptor, architect, active in England, remembered for Dorich House
 Katrin Koov (born 1973), large public projects since 2000
 Marika Lõoke (born 1951), office buildings
 Margit Mutso (born 1966), apartment buildings
 Erika Nõva (1905–1987), Estonia's first female architect
 Maarja Nummert (born 1944), schools
 Valve Pormeister (1922–2002), highly influential in Soviet era
 Mai Šein (born 1946), housing and university addition, has own business
 Hilda Taba (1902–1967), took up work in New York City because Tartu University would not employ a woman
 Meeli Truu (1946–2013), active in Tallinn
 Veronika Valk (born 1976), various large buildings, also lectures widely
 Siiri Vallner (born 1972), installations and various building projects

Finland
 Aino Aalto (1894–1949), first wife of Alvar Aalto using the Functionalist style, later turning to interiors
 Elissa Aalto (1922–1994), second wife of Alvar Aalto, with whom she designed the opera house in Essen
 Elsa Arokallio (1892–1982), after her husband died, ran her own business
 Elsi Borg (1893–1958), after graduating in 1919, designed a hospital and a church
Elna Kiljander (1889–1970), early female architect active in Functionalism
 Hilda Hongell (1867–1952), possibly the first woman in Finland to run her own practice
 Signe Hornborg (1862–1916), possibly the first qualified female architect in the world
 Eva Kuhlefelt-Ekelund (1892–1984)
 Kristiina Lassus (born 1966), designer
 Wivi Lönn (1872–1966), several notable buildings; first woman to be granted title of professor by Finnish Association
 Martta Martikainen-Ypyä (1904–1992), designed many public buildings alone or with husband Ragnar Ypyä
 Raili Pietilä (born 1926), closely cooperated with husband Raili Pietilä
 Kaija Siren (1920–2001), worked with her husband Heikki Siren

France
 Katherine Briçonnet (ca. 1494–1526), supervised the construction of Château de Chenonceau
 Iwona Buczkowska (born 1953), award-winning architect and urban planner
 Georgette Cottin-Euziol (1926-2004) French Algerian architect, one of the first women architects in both countries
 Anne Debarre (born 1957), academic and researcher
 Odile Decq (born 1955), award-winning architect
 Anne Démians (born mid–1960s), established her own firm in Paris in 2004
Elizabeth de Portzamparc, award-winning French-Brazilian architect
 Françoise Fromonot (born 1958), architectural critic
 Catherine Furet (born 1954), specializes in social housing
 Renée Gailhoustet (born 1929), social housing in Paris suburbs
 Manuelle Gautrand (born 1961), versatile modern architect working in many areas
 Dominique Gauzin-Müller (born 1960), architect and architectural critic
 Édith Girard (1949–2014), practicing architect in the area of social housing
 Pascale Guédot (born 1960), awarded the Prix de l'Équerre d'Argent
 Solange d'Herbez de la Tour (born 1924)
 Françoise-Hélène Jourda (1955–2015), educator and proponent of sustainable architecture
Anne Lacaton (born 1955), French architect and educator, co-founder of Lacaton & Vassal
 Marine Miroux (born 1977), French architect working in Berlin
 Charlotte Perriand (1903–1999), visionary designer and architect who inspired Le Corbusier
 Edith Schreiber-Aujame (1919–1998), Franco-American architect and urban planner
 Marion Tournon-Branly (1924–2016)
 Corinne Vezzoni (born 1964), awarded the Prix Femmes Architectes

Germany 
 Karola Bloch (1905–1994), emigrated to Vienna, Paris, Prague and New York before returning to Germany
 Elisabeth Böhm (1921–2012), wife of the better known Gottfried Böhm
 Eva Buhrich (1915–1976), architectural commentator in Australia
 Brigitte D'Ortschy (1921–1990), architect, journalist, Zen master
 Kristin Feireiss (born 1942), architect, curator, writer, active in the Netherlands
 Charlotte Frank (born 1959), partner with Axel Schultes, Berlin
 Dörte Gatermann (born 1956), Triangle Tower in Cologne
 Anna Heringer (born 1977), award-winning proponent of sustainable architecture
 Lucy Hillebrand (1906–1997), latterly educational buildings
 Margrit Kennedy (1939–2013), specializing in ecological building techniques
 Anna Klingmann (born 1965), theorist of brandism, the connection of branding and architecture
 Sigrid Kressmann-Zschach (1929–1990), first shopping mall in Germany
 Brigitte Peterhans (born 1928), worked on many renowned buildings internationally, including the Sears Tower, Chicago
 Lilly Reich (1885–1947), Bauhaus-trained, German modernist designer, interior architect
Lou Scheper-Berkenkamp (1901–1976), Bauhaus-trained, architectural colorist
 Thekla Schild (1890–1991), Germany's second female architectural graduate
 Barbara Schock-Werner (born 1947), Cologne Cathedral
Maria Schwarz (1921–2018), architect best known for designing churches
 Annabelle Selldorf (born early 1960s), founded her own agency in New York
 Lotte Stam-Beese (1903–1988), Bauhaus-trained, helped with the post-war reconstruction of Rotterdam
Judith Stolzer-Segall (1904–1990), first female architect to design a synagogue
Gerdy Troost (1904–2003), Nazi architecture projects
 Emilie Winkelmann (1875–1951), Germany's first independent female architect

Greece
 Souzána Antonakáki (1935-2020), founder of Atelier 66 in Athens
 Alexandra Paschalidou-Moreti (1912–2010), designed pavilions for international exhibitions

Hungary
 Eva Vecsei (born 1930), see Canada

Iceland
 Högna Sigurðardóttir (1929–2017), first woman to design a building in Iceland

Ireland
 Angela Brady (born c. 1957), elected president of the UK's Royal Institute of British Architects in 2011
 Yvonne Farrell (born 1951), co-founder of award-winning Grafton Architects in Dublin
 Eileen Gray (1878–1976), lived and worked primarily in France
 Selma Harrington (born 1955), see Bosnia and Herzegovina
Róisín Heneghan, co-founder of Heneghan Peng Architects
Shelley McNamara (born 1952), co-founder of award-winning Grafton Architects in Dublin
 Caroline O'Donnell (born c. 1974), winner of MoMA PS1 Young Architects Program (New York) 2013
 Sheila O'Donnell (born 1953), co-founder of O’Donnell + Tuomey Architects; designed several award-winning buildings around Dublin

Italy
 Paola Antonelli (born 1963), senior curator of the department of architecture & design at the Museum of Modern Art (MoMA), New York City
 Gae Aulenti (1927–2012), architect, interior designer and industrial designer
 Lina Bo Bardi (1914–1992), moved to Brazil after the war and became a naturalized Brazilian citizen
 Cini Boeri (1924–2020), architect, interior designer and industrial designer
 Plautilla Bricci (1616–1690), architect and painter in and near Rome
Maria Hadfield Cosway (1760–1838) amateur architect, patron, and painter
 Anna Castelli Ferrieri (1918–2006), architect and industrial designer
 Alessandra Cianchetta (born 1971), founding partner of AWP Paris, large-scale urban redevelopment
 Silvana De Stefano, architect and sculptor
 Stefania Filo Speziale (1905–1988), first woman to graduate from an architecture program in Naples
 Doriana Mandrelli Fuksas (born 1944), founding partner of Fuksas Studio in Rome
 Giulia Guarino (1897–1985), Italian/Uruguayan architect first Latin American woman to graduate with a degree in architecture in 1923
 Franca Helg (1920–1989), architect and designer
 Anna Maria Indrio (born 1943), see Denmark
 Elena Luzzatto (1900–1983), first woman to graduate from an architecture program in Italy
 Rosaria Piomelli (born 1937), architect and academic
 Teresa Sapey (born 1962), own studio in Madrid, also academic
 Afra Scarpa (1937–2011), of Afra and Tobia Scarpa
 Benedetta Tagliabue (born 1963), based in Barcelona, Spain
Paola Viganò (born 1961), got awarded a Gold Medal for Italian Architecture for her career in 2018
 Lauretta Vinciarelli (1943–2011), artist, architect, educator

Luxembourg
 Tatiana Fabeck (born 1970), large-scale university development
 Arlette Schneiders (born late 1950s), first woman in Luxembourg to have her own firm

Malta
 Isabelle Barratt-Delia (born 1938), first Maltese female architect

Montenegro
 Svetlana Kana Radević (1937–2000), first Montenegrin female architect

Netherlands
 Fleur Agema (born 1976), politician, former spatial designer
 Caroline Bos (born 1959), co-founder of UNStudio, an award-winning architecture firm in Amsterdam
 Luzia Hartsuyker-Curjel (1926–2011), German-born Dutch architect remembered for her innovative housing designs
 Francine Houben (born 1955), founding partner of Mecanoo; visiting professor at Harvard University
 Barbara Kuit (born 1998), co-founder of Information Based Architecture
 Judith Ledeboer (1901–1990), see United Kingdom
 Han Schröder (1918–1992), after establishing her own firm in Amsterdam, emigrated to the United States where she taught interior design
 Margaret Staal-Kropholler (1891–1966), first woman architect in the Netherlands
 Nathalie de Vries (born 1965), co-founder of MVRDV
 Tonny Zwollo (born 1942), built 35 schools in Oaxaca, Mexico and the largest open air market in South America, in Ecuador
 Liesbeth van der Pol (born 1959), co-founder Dok architecten

Norway
 Kari Nissen Brodtkorb (born 1942), architect and educator, Houen Foundation Award for Stranden housing complex in Oslo
 Lilla Hansen (1872–1962), Norway's first female architect
 Kristin Jarmund (born 1954), runs her own business, Kristin Jarmund Arkitekter
 Hjørdis Grøntoft Raknerud (1878–1918), early Norwegian female architect
 Kirsten Sand (1895–1996), first woman to graduate in architecture from the Norwegian Institute of Technology
 Wenche Selmer (1920–1998), specialized in timber residential projects in the south of Norway
 Kirsten Sinding-Larsen (1898–1978), designed Sunnaas Hospital

Poland
 Barbara Bielecka (born 1931), designed the Basilica of Our Lady of Licheń, Poland's largest church
 Karola Bloch (1905–1994), worked in Austria, the United States and Germany
 Barbara Brukalska (1899–1980), Functionalist architect, educator
 Adrienne Górska (1899–1969), Russian-born Polish architect working in Paris
Jadwiga Grabowska-Hawrylak (1920–2018), first woman to be awarded the Honorary Award of the Association of Polish Architects (SARP)

Portugal
 Maria José Marques da Silva (1914–1996), first female architecture graduate from Porto's School of Fine Arts

Romania
 Maria Cotescu (1896–1980), one of the first women architects of Romania; built the National railway industrial complex
 Henrieta Delavrancea (1897–1987), one of the first female architects admitted to the Superior School of Architecture in Bucharest
 Virginia Andreescu Haret (1894–1962), first female graduate in architecture and first female Romanian Architectural Inspector General
 Anca Petrescu (1949–2013), architect and politician

Russia
 Nina Aleshina (1924–2012), designer of 19 stations of the Moscow Metro and head of the Metrogiprotrans design department, 1981–1991
 Galina Balashova (born 1931), architect and designer associated with the Soviet space program
 Adrienne Górska (1899–1969), born in Moscow of Polish extraction, early female graduate in Paris (1924) where she worked in the Art Deco style
 Tamara Katsenelenbogen (1894–1976), constructivist architect and urban planner
 Dita Roque-Gourary (1915–2010), see Belgium
 Rachel Bernstein Wischnitzer (1885–1989), born in the Russian Empire, moved to the U.S. in 1940

Serbia
 Ksenija Bulatović (born 1967), educational and commercial buildings, also academic
 Jelisaveta Načić (1878–1955), first female architect in Serbia
 Jovanka Bončić-Katerinić (1887–1966), 1st woman engineer in Germany
 Ljiljana Bakić (born 1939), designed the award-winning Aleksandar Nikolić Hall
 Ivanka Raspopović (1930–2015), designed the award-winning Museum of Contemporary Art
 Milica Šterić (1914–1998), head of Energoprojekt’s architecture department
 Maja Vidaković Lalić (born 1972), designed the Supermarket Store in Belgrade, founder of the Mikser Festival
 Olja Ivanjicki (1931–2009), artist in sculpture, poetry, design, architecture and writing
 Dubravka Sekulić (born 1980), architectural researcher and theorist

Slovenia

 Sonja Lapajne Oblak (1906–1993) Slovenian architect, first Slovenian woman to graduate as a civil engineer, Slovenia's first female urban planner.

 Marjetica Potrč (born 1953), installations, research

Spain
 Roser Amadó (born 1944), architect working in Barcelona
 Margarita Brender Rubira (1919–2002), Romanian-born architect active in Barcelona
Ángela García de Paredes (born 1958), co-founded the Paredes Pedrosa studio
 Matilde Ucelay Maortúa (1912–2008), first woman licensed in architecture in Spain
Fuensanta Nieto (born 1957), partner of Nieto Sobejano Arquitectos
Carme Pigem (born 1962), a member of the Pritzker Prize-winning architectural firm RCR Arquitectes
 Carme Pinós (born 1954)
 Beatriz Ramo (born 1979), Spanish architect working in the Dutch city of Rotterdam
 Benedetta Tagliabue (born 1963), see Italy
 Patricia Urquiola (born 1961), working in Milan, Italy since 1990
Elisa Valero (born 1971), architect and professor

Sweden
 Anna Branzell (1895–1983), Norwegian-born Swedish architect, first woman to graduate in architecture in Sweden
 Léonie Geisendorf (1914–2016), Polish-born Swedish architect working in Stockholm
 Mia Hägg (born 1970), her firm, Habiter Autrement, is based in Paris
 Margit Hall (1901–1937), first woman in Sweden to graduate in architecture as an ordinary student
 Agnes Magnell (1878–1966), first woman accepted to the architecture program at the Royal Institute of Technology; was not allowed to graduate since she was accepted on exception; designed the water tower in Sala in 1903
 Greta Magnusson-Grossman (1906–1999), furniture designer and architect
 Pernilla Ohrstedt (born 1980), London-based Swedish architect
 Brita Snellman (1901–1978), first woman to graduate in architecture at the Royal Institute of Technology, in 1924
Hillevi Svedberg (1910–1990), remembered for collective housing interiors
 Inga Varg (born 1952), urban planning, interior design and architecture
 Ingeborg Wærn Bugge (1899–1991), early Swedish graduate, residential buildings, schools, renovation

Switzerland
 Angela Deuber (born 1975), architect, educator
 Annette Gigon (born 1959), architect, educator
 Lux Guyer (1894–1955), architect behind the SAFFA women's fair in Bern
 Inès Lamunière (born 1954), architect, educator, editor
 Gret Loewensberg (born 1943), works in domestic architecture
 Berta Rahm (1910–1998), architect, writer, publisher
Flora Ruchat-Roncati (1937–2012), first woman professor and chair of Architecture and Design at ETH Zurich
 Flora Steiger-Crawford (1899–1991), first Swiss woman to graduate in architecture

Turkey
 Leman Tomsu (1913–1988), one of the first Turkish women to qualify as an architect in 1934

United Kingdom
 Norah Aiton (1903–1988), early modernist architect
 Jill Allibone (1932–1998), architectural historian, founder of the Mausolea and Monuments Trust
 Julia Barfield (born 1952), co-founder of Marks Barfield Architects with David Marks; known for designing the London Eye
Margaret Justin Blanco White (1911–2001), Scottish modernist architect, was awarded an OBE in 1973
 Teresa Borsuk (born 1956), winner of Architects' Journal Woman Architect of the Year 2015
 Isobel Hogg Kerr Beattie (1900–1970), perhaps the first female architect in regular practice in Scotland
 Elisabeth Benjamin (1908–1999), first generation of British female architects
 Corinne Bennett (1935–2010), conservation and cathedral architect
 Jos Boys
 Elizabeth Cadbury-Brown (1922–2002), American-born architect working in London with her husband H. T. Cadbury-Brown
 Ethel Charles (1871–1962), first woman to be admitted to RIBA
 Elizabeth Chesterton (1915–2002), architect and town planner
 Catherine Cooke (1942–2004), academic and writer on Russian architecture
 Dame Sylvia Crowe (1901–1997), landscape architect
 Dame Jane Drew (1911–1996), architect, town planner, proponent of modernism
 Jane Duncan (born 1953), RIBA President-elect (2014)
 Kathryn Findlay (1954–2014), worked in Japan 1979 to 1999, before returning to the UK
Wendy Foster (1937–1989), co-founder of Team 4 and Foster Associates
 Dame Zaha Hadid (1950–2016), see Iraq
 Susannah Hagan (born 1951), educator, Royal College of Art School of Architecture
 Diane Haigh (1949–2022), conservation architect
 Edith Gillian Harrison (1898–1974), one of the first four women students to graduate from the Architectural Association School of Architecture
 Rachel Haugh, co-founder of SimpsonHaugh and Partners
 Patty Hopkins (born 1942), Royal Gold Medal winner
 Edith Hughes (1888–1971), probably Britain's first female practicing architect
 Louisa Hutton (born 1957), co-founder of Sauerbruch Hutton
 Eva Jiřičná (born 1939),  see Czech Republic
 Judith Ledeboer (1901–1990), designed schools, universities and public housing
 Gertrude Leverkus (1899–1976), German-born architect
 Amanda Levete (born 1955), co-founder of Future Systems, head of AL A
 Sara Losh (1785–1853), architect of St Mary's Church, Wreay, Cumbria, 1840–42
 Kate Macintosh (born 1937), designed public housing in London
 Kirsteen Mackay, in 2015 appointed South Australian Government Architect
 Mary Medd (1907–2005), public buildings including schools
 Marian Pepler (1904–1997), architect, rug designer
 Margaret Richards (1928–2022), Scottish architect
 Matrix Feminist Design Co-operative (1980–1984)
 Monica Pidgeon (1913–2009), interior designer, Honorary Fellow of the RIBA, AIA and Architectural Association
 Ruth Reed, first female president of the Royal Institute of British Architects, 2009–2011
 Su Rogers (née Brumwell, born 1939), founding member of Team 4 and co-designer of the Centre Georges Pompidou
 Diana Rowntree (1915–2008), architectural writer
 Nathalie Rozencwajg (born 1975), co-founder of RARE Architecture
 Winifred Ryle (1897–1987), early female student at the Architectural Association School of Architecture
 Flora Samuel, head of the School of Architecture at Sheffield University since 2009
 Deborah Saunt, co-founder of DSHDA in London
 Elisabeth Scott (1898–1972), first woman architect to win an international architecture competition
 Alison Smithson (1928–1993), practitioner of Brutalist architecture
 Rosemary Stjernstedt (1912–1998), designed public housing in London
 Sarah Susanka (born 1957), best known for her Not So Big books
 Mary Townley (1753–1839), of Ramsgate; pupil of Joshua Reynolds; designer of Townley House
 Jane Wernick (born 1954), architect, educator, associated with the London Eye
 Sarah Wigglesworth, founder of Sarah Wigglesworth Architects; multi-RIBA Award winner; Professor of Architecture at Sheffield University
 Lady Elizabeth Wilbraham (1632–1705), probably the first known female architect
 Georgie Wolton (born 1934), founding member of Team 4

North America

Belize
 Esther Ayuso (born 1958), first female architect of Belize, born in Venezuela; specializes in hospital design
 Sue Courtenay (born c. 1966), first female president of the Federation of Caribbean Association of Architects

Canada
 Alexandra Biriukova (1895–1967), first woman to register with the Ontario Association of Architects
 Shirley Blumberg (born 1952), founding partner of KPMB Architects
 Giovanna Borasi (born 1971), Italian-born Canadian architect, curator of the Canadian Centre for Architecture
 Alison Brooks (born 1962), moved to the UK in 1989; Stirling Prize winner 2008
 Pamela Cluff (born 1931), accessibility design
 Teresa Coady (born 1956), sustainability and energy-saving design
 Marie-Chantal Croft (born c. 1970), Quebec architect
 Beatrice Centner Davidson (1909–1986), Toronto architect
 Blanche Lemco van Ginkel (born 1923), Modernist architect
 Lennox Grafton (1919–2017), design and project architect for the Government of Canada
 Jean Hall (1896–1982), B. Arch. University of Toronto, 1923, first Canadian-trained female architect to design a building in Canada
 Esther Hill (1895–1983), first female architect to graduate in Canada, from University of Toronto in 1920
 Barbara Humphreys (died 2017), architect and author, specializing in public service, historic preservation, and housing
 Lily Inglis (1926–2010), Italian-born Canadian architect
 Phyllis Lambert (born 1927), architect and philanthropist
 Martha Stewart Leitch (1918–2015) (fl. 2006), Toronto architect, Fellow of the RAIC
 Elizabeth Lord, B. Arch. University of Manitoba, (graduated 1939); first woman to register with the Manitoba Association of Architects
 Janet Leys Shaw Mactavish (1925–1972), university buildings
 Alice Malhiot (1889–1968), first Canadian woman to receive a diploma in architecture
 Marianne McKenna (born 1950), founding partner of KPMB Architects
Cornelia Oberlander (1921–2021), landscape architect
 Mother Joseph Pariseau (1823–1902), religious sister who designed buildings in the state of Washington
 Patricia Patkau (born 1950), architect and founder of Patkau Architects
 Helga Plumb (born 1939), Austrian-born architect and design critic
 Brigitte Shim (born 1958), born in Jamaica, founding partner of Shim-Sutcliffe Architects; tenured professor at the University of Toronto's John H. Daniels Faculty of Architecture
 Eva Vecsei (born 1930), Hungarian-born architect active in Montreal
 Catherine Mary Wisnicki (1919–2014)

Cuba
 María Margarita Egaña Fernández (1921–1975), Cuban modernist architect

Dominican Republic
 Margot Taule (1920–2008), first registered professional engineer and architect in the Dominican Republic

Jamaica
 Nadine Isaacs (1942–2004), first female head of the Jamaican Institute of Architects and Caribbean School of Architecture
 Verma Panton (1936–2015), first female architect of Jamaica and of the Anglo-Caribbean

Mexico
 Tatiana Bilbao (born 1972), best known for the Botanical Garden of Sinaloa in Culiacán
 Clara de Buen Richkarday (born 1954), metro stations in Mexico City
 Gabriela Carrillo, partner of the practice Taller Rocha + Carillo
 Fernanda Canales (born 1974), architect, designer, curator
 Frida Escobedo (born 1979), architect best known for the 2018 Serpentine Pavilion, and La Tallera Siquieros in Cuernavaca.
 María Luisa Dehesa Gómez Farías (1912–2009), first female architecture graduate in Mexico and Latin America
 Laura Itzel Castillo (born 1957), architect, politician
 Ruth Rivera Marín (1927–1969), first female graduate of College of Engineering and Architecture at the National Polytechnic Institute
 Beatriz Peschard (born 1970), architect, editor, and partner of Bernardi + Peschard Arquitectura
 Teresa Táboas (born 1961), architect, professor and Galician politician
 Sara Topelson de Grinberg (born 1945), educational, commercial, and cultural buildings; professor

Puerto Rico
 Beatriz del Cueto (born 1952 in Havana), conservation, academic

United States

This list of United States women architects includes notable women architects with a strong connection to the United States, i.e. born in the USA, located in the USA, or known primarily for their work in the USA.

A
 Constance Abernathy (1931–1994), architectural collaborator with Buckminster Fuller
 Ruth Maxon Adams (1883–1970), designer for Yelping Hill, Connecticut
 Diana Agrest (born 1945), architect and urban designer in New York City
 Nellie B. Allen (1874–1961), landscape architect known for her knot gardens
 Rachel Allen (born 1970), architect based in Los Angeles
 Mary Almy (1883–1976), one of three women who founded Howe, Manning & Almy, Inc. in Boston, Massachusetts
 Kathryn H. Anthony, architect, educator, writer
 Paola Antonelli (born 1963), see Italy
 Mai Arbegast (1992–2012), landscape architect, educator
 Alice Constance Austin (1868–ca. 1930), designed houses to reduce domestic labor so as to promote gender equality
 Violeta Autumn (1930–2012), Peruvian-born, Sausalito, California architect and city councilwoman
 Elizabeth Ayer (1897–1987), pioneering woman architect in Seattle, Washington

B
 Agnes Ballard (1877–1969) Florida's first registered woman architect and first woman AIA
 Diana Balmori (1932–2016), landscape and urban designer
 Julie Bargmann (born 1958), landscape architect, educator
 Carol Ross Barney (born 1949), founder of Ross Barney Architects, 1981
 Nora Barney (1883–1971), civil engineer, architect and suffragist
 Katherine Bashford (1885–1953), landscape architect active in Southern California
 Karen Bausman (born 1958), has taught at both Harvard University and Yale University
 Ann Beha (born 1950), Boston architect
 Laura Bennett (born 1963), architect and fashion designer
 Deborah Berke (born 1954), founder of Deborah Berke & Partners Architects in New York City
 Barbara Bestor (born 1969), active in Los Angeles, California
 Louise Blanchard Bethune (1856–1948), first American woman known to have worked as a professional architect
 Rebecca L. Binder (born 1951), architect, designer, and educator, who was named a Fellow of the American Institute of Architects
 Phyllis Birkby (1932–1994), practicing architect, educator and proponent of women's role in architecture
 Norma Bonniwell (1877–1961), worked with her father in North Carolina
 India Boyer (1907–1998), first female architect in Ohio
 Louise Braverman (born 1948), New York-based architect who is a Fellow of the American Institute of Architects
 Lilian Bridgman (1866–1948), active in California after World War I
 Cornelia Brierly (1913–2012), worked with Frank Lloyd Wright
 Sara Bronin, architect and historic preservationist
 Angela Brooks, co-founder of Brooks + Scarpa in Los Angeles, California
 Elizabeth Carter Brooks (1867–1951), African American architect, educator and activist
 Daphne Brown (1948–2011), highly acclaimed Alaskan architect
 Debra M. Brown (born 1963), judge, worked as an architect in Washington, D.C.
 Denise Scott Brown (born 1931), see Zambia
 Lori Brown (born 1969), co-founder of ArchiteXX, educator
 Emma Brunson (1887–1980), opened her own firm in Minnesota
 Cory Buckner, restoration architect in Los Angeles, California
 Katharine Budd (1860–1951), pioneering woman architect admitted to the AIA in 1924 after practicing for 30 years
 Pamela Burton (born 1948), landscape architect
 Emily Helen Butterfield (1884–1958), Michigan's first licensed female architect

C
 Elizabeth Cadbury-Brown (1922–2002), American-born architect who practiced in New York and London
 Alma Carlisle (born 1927), African American architect who helped preserve historic structures in Los Angeles, California
 Alberta Jeannette Cassell (1926–2007), African American architect who worked for the U.S. Navy
 Olive Chadeayne (1904–2001), architect, specifications writer
 Judith Chafee (1932–1988), architect, educator, residential buildings in Arizona
 Josephine Wright Chapman (1867–1943), active in Boston, Massachusetts
 Annie Chu, Chinese American architect and educator in Los Angeles, California
 Jane West Clauss (1907–2003), architect and educator
 Elizabeth Close (1912–2011), pioneering female architect in Minneapolis, Minnesota
 Rose Connor (1892–1970), early woman architect in Pasadena, California
 Marian Cruger Coffin (1876–1957), pioneering landscape architect
 Elisabeth Coit (1897–1987), own firm in New York City
 Doris Cole (born 1938), co-founder of Cole and Goyette, Architects and Planners in Cambridge, Massachusetts, Massachusetts
 Melissa Minnich Coleman (1917–2014), active in Pennsylvania, specialized in school buildings
 Mary Colter (1869–1958), chief architect of the Fred Harvey Company
Lise Anne Couture (born 1959), co-founder of Asymptote Architecture
 Dana Hudkins Crawford (born 1931), architectural conservation developer and preservationist for Downtown Denver, Colorado
 Mary Ann Crawford (1901–1988), architect in Illinois
 Dana Cuff, architecture theorist and educator and founder of CityLab

D
 Mary Lund Davis (1922–1998), modernist architect from the Pacific Northwest
 Natalie Griffin de Blois (1921–2013), partner for many years in the architectural firm of Skidmore, Owings and Merrill
 Edna Deakin (1871–1946), considered one of the earliest American women architects
 Peggy Deamer (born 1950), architect, educator, principal at Deamer, Architects
 Katherine Diamond (born 1954), first woman to be president of the Los Angeles chapter of the AIA
 Elizabeth Diller (born 1954), co-founder of Diller Scofidio + Renfro in 1979
 Julia Lester Dillon (1871–1959), Georgia landscape architect and columnist
 Betsey Doughtery, California architect, recipient of AIACC Lifetime Achievement Award, 2017
 Henrietta Dozier (1872–1947), first female architect in Georgia
 Winka Dubbeldam (born 1966), Dutch-born American architect active in New York City
 Ena Dubnoff, Southern California architect

E
 Tammy Eagle Bull, architect
 Ray Eames (1912–1988)
Keller Easterling (born 1959), architect, urbanist and writer
 Judith Edelman (1923–2014), co-founder of Edelman Sultan Knox Wood/Architects
 Merrill Elam, active in Atlanta, Georgia, co-founded her own firm in 1984
Dora Epstein-Jones, educator, theorist and curator

F
 Beatrix Farrand (1872–1959), landscape architect
 Jessica Farrar (born 1966)
 Roberta M. Feldman, educator, University of Illinois, Chicago
 Katherine Cutler Ficken (1911–1968), first licensed female architect in Maryland (1936)
 Elizabeth Hirsh Fleisher (1892–1975), first registered female architect in Philadelphia
 Jean B. Fletcher (1915–1965), founding member of the Architects' Collaborative
 Helen Liu Fong (1927–2005), Chinese-American architect and interior designer who practiced in Los Angeles, California
 Anne Fougeron (born 1955), active in California
 Helen French (1900–1994), latterly based in San Francisco
 Margaret Fritsch (1899–1993), first female architect in Oregon
 Ethel Furman (1899–1993), earliest African American female architect in Virginia

G
 Jeanne Gang (born 1964), award-winning leader of Studio Gang Architects
 Mary Gannon (1867–1932), co-founder of Gannon and Hands
 Carolyn Geise (born 1935), Seattle-based architect
 Elsa Gidoni (1901–1978), German-born architect and interior designer
 Madeline Gins (1941–2014), collaborated with Shusaku Arakawa on the Mechanism of Meaning
 Joan E. Goody (1935–2009), modern architecture in Boston
 Lois Gottlieb (1926–2018), one of the five women featured in the documentary A girl is a fellow here
 Rose Greely (1887–1969), first licensed female architect in Washington, D.C.
 Beverly Loraine Greene (1915–1957), first registered African American female architect in the US
 Marion Mahony Griffin (1871–1961), one of the first licensed female architects in the world

H
 Leola Hall (1881–1930), first female architect in Berkeley, California
 Frances Halsband (born 1943), AIA design committee
 Alice Hands, co-founder of Gannon and Hands
 Sarah P. Harkness (1914–2013), president of the Boston Society of Architects
 Georgia Louise Harris Brown (1918–1999), second African American woman to become a licensed architect in the United States
 Jane Hastings (born 1928), in Seattle; first female chancellor of the AIA College of Fellows
 Sophia Hayden (1868–1953), Chilean-born American architect, first woman architecture graduate from MIT, best known for designing the Woman's Building at the World's Columbian Exposition
 Margo Hebald-Heymann, 1960s graduate, contributed to Terminal One, Los Angeles International Airport
 Margaret Helfand (1947–2007), own firm in New York City
 Edith Henderson (1911–2005), landscape architect
 Frances Henley (1896–1955), early female architect in Rhode Island
 Margaret Hicks (1858–1883)
 E. E. Holman (1854–1925) (aka Emily Elizabeth Holman) (fl. 1892–1915), early female architect in Pennsylvania
 Victorine du Pont Homsey (1900–1998), founding partner in the firm of Victorine & Samuel Homsey
 Mary Rockwell Hook (1877–1978), denied admission to AIA due to her gender
 Lois Howe (1864–1964), founder of the all female firm in Boston, Howe, Manning & Almy, Inc.
 Elinor Mead Howells (1837–1910), artist, architect, aristocrat
 Ada Louise Huxtable (1921–2013), architecture critic
 Joyce Hwang, architect and urban planner

I
 Elizabeth Wright Ingraham (1922–2013), architect and granddaughter of Frank Lloyd Wright
 Harriet Morrison Irwin (1828–1897), early female architect from North Carolina
Lisa Iwamoto, Japanese-American architect, co-founder of IwamotoScott, and Associate Professor at University of California, Berkeley.

J
 Mary Rutherfurd Jay (1872–1953), early landscape architect
 Alice E. Johnson (1862–1936), early architect from Ohio
Sharon Johnston, founding partner of the firm Johnston Marklee & Associates

K
 Michelle Kaufmann, green architect and designer
 Anna Keichline (1889–1943), first registered female architect in Pennsylvania
 Fay Kellogg (1871–1918), "the foremost woman architect in the United States" in the early 20th century
 Sheila Kennedy, Professor of Architecture at MIT, winner of International Building Exhibition award
 Gertrude Lempp Kerbis (1926–2016), modernist architect with Bauhaus connections, and with links to Frank Lloyd Wright
 Florence Knoll (1917–2019), architect and furniture designer
 Rosalyn Koo (born 1929), Chinese-born American, manager at MBT Associates, San Francisco, also a philanthropist
 Gertrude Kuh (1893–1977), landscape architect active in the Chicago area

L
 Ellamae Ellis League (1899–1991), first woman FAIA from Georgia
 Grace La (born 1970), Professor of Architecture at Harvard University, co-founder of LA DALLMAN in Boston, MA and Milwaukee, WI
 Cara Lee, co-founded a firm in Los Angeles, California, in 2003
 Andrea Leers, founded the Boston-based firm Leers Weinzapfel Associates
 Brenda Levin, based in Los Angeles, California, advocate of historic preservation
 Diane Lewis (1951–2017), architect, first female faculty at Cooper Union
 Maya Lin (born 1959), designer of the Vietnam Veterans Memorial in Washington, D.C.
 Jing Liu (architect) (born 1980), co-founder of new York-based firm SO-IL
 Mimi Lobell (1942–2001), architect and academic
 MJ Long (1939–2018), principal architect partner on the British Library in London
 Ivenue Love-Stanley, first African American woman licensed architect in the Southeast
 Florence Luscomb (1887–1985)

M
 Marion Manley (1893–1984), based in Florida, collaborated on the University of Miami campus
 Elisabeth Martini (1886–1984), active in Chicago
 Susan Maxman (1938–1997), first woman president of the AIA (1992)
 Ida McCain (born 1884, date of death unknown), early female architect active on the West oast
 Margaret McCurry (born 1942), partner with Stanley Tigerman in Tigerman McCurry Architects in  Chicago
 Marcia Mead (1879–1967), partner in the early female firm Schenck & Mead in New York City
 Elise Mercur (1869–1947), early female architect in Pennsylvania
 Amaza Lee Meredith (1895–1984), early African American architect, known for Azurest South
 Harriet Moody (1891–1966)
 Julia Morgan (1872–1957), first woman to obtain an architecture degree at the École des Beaux-Arts
 Toshiko Mori (born 1951), Japanese architect based in New York City
 Gertrude Comfort Morrow (ca. 1888–1983), opened her own office in San Francisco, contributed to the Golden Gate Bridge
 Edla Muir (1906–1971), designed residences in Southern California
 Louise Caldwell Murdock (1857–1915), interior designer and architect active in Wichita, Kansas

N
 Edith Northman (1893–1956), one of Southern California's first women architects

O
 Eleanor Manning O'Connor (1884–1973), partner in the female firm Howe, Manning & Almy, Inc. in Boston
 Kathleen O'Donnell (born 1988), architect and founding partner of Studio Gang/O'Donnell [Now Studio/Gang]
 Carole J. Olshavsky (born 1947), own firm in 1975, state architect for Ohio
 Kate Orff (born 1971), landscape architect, founder of SCAPE

P
 Mary L. Page (1849–1921), first American woman to graduate in architecture in the United States
 Cary Millholland Parker (1902–2001), landscape architect, worked with Rose Greely and Gertrude Sawyer
 Elizabeth Pattee (1893–1991)
 Juliet Peddle (1899–1979), first woman architect licensed in Indiana
 Brigitte Peterhans (born 1928), worked on many renowned buildings internationally, including the Sears Tower, Chicago
 Nelle Peters (1884–1974), prolific architect in Kansas City
 Carolyn Peterson, Texas preservation architect and Fellow of the AIA
 Eleanore Pettersen (1916–2003), one of the first female architects in New Jersey
 Alberta Pfeiffer (1899–1994), one of the first female architects in Illinois
 Marjorie Pierce (1900–1999), architect who practiced in Massachusetts
 Elizabeth Plater-Zyberk (born 1950), co-founder of Miami's Duany Plater-Zyberk & Company; academic
 Linda Pollari, active in Los Angeles, California
 Monica Ponce de Leon (born 1965), National Design Award Winner; practicing architect; founder of MPdL Studio
 Ethel B. Power (1881–1969), writer on architecture and magazine editor

R
 Amy Porter Rapp (1908–2002), active in Portland, Oregon
 Eleanor Raymond (1888–1989), prominent architect in Boston and Cambridge, Massachusetts
 Florence Kenyon Hayden Rector (1882–1973), first licensed female architect in Ohio
 Hilde Reiss (1909–2002) (fl. 1930s–1960s), German-born architect, active in Minneapolis
 Lilian Jeannette Rice (1889–1938), worked in California in the Spanish colonial style
 Elizabeth Chu Richter (born 1949), originally from Hong Kong but made her career in Texas; 2015 President of the AIA; has designed notable buildings in the Corpus Christi area
 Theodate Pope Riddle (1867–1946), first female licensed architect in both New York and Connecticut
 Jane Silverstein Ries (1909–2005), Colorado landscape architect
 Lutah Maria Riggs (1896–1984), early female architect, active in Southern California, especially Santa Barbara, California
 Isabel Roberts (1871–1955), member of the architectural design team in the Oak Park Studio of Frank Lloyd Wright
 Annie Rockfellow (1866–1954), prolific architect in Tucson, Arizona
 Rocio Romero (born 1971), Chilean-American architect
 Karla Rothstein (born 1966), German American architect, educator, active in New York City
 Sigrid Lorenzen Rupp (1943–2004), German-born architect in Silicon Valley
 Marie Russak (1865–1945), singer, esotericist, also designed houses in Krotona, California
 Ida Annah Ryan (1873–1950), pioneering woman architect

S
 Patricia Saldaña Natke (born 1964), founding partner of UrbanWorks, Chicago
 Christine Salmon (1916–1985), mainly residential, focus on housing for the disabled
 Verna Cook Salomonsky (1890–1950), mainly residential architecture
Hilary Sample, principal and co-founder of award-winning architecture firm MOS Architects
 Adèle Naudé Santos, based in San Francisco, focus on low-income housing
 Gertrude Sawyer (1895–1996), early female architect in Maryland and Washington D.C.
 Anna Pendleton Schenck (1874–1915), partner in the New York firm of Schenck & Mead
 Cathy Simon, San Francisco Bay Area architect
 Norma Sklarek (1926–2012), first black female licensed architect in the US
 Chloethiel Woodard Smith (1910–1992), architect and urban planner in Washington, D.C.
 Anna Sokolina (born 1956), PhD, architect, author, curator, educator, founder and Chair of Women in Architecture AG, the WiA AG Legacy Committee, and the WiA AG Registers Committee of the Society of Architectural Historians)
 Laurinda Hope Spear (born 1950), co-founder of Arquitectonica
 Margaret Fulton Spencer (1882–1966), second woman to become a member of the American Institute of Architects
 Lenore Thomas Straus (1909–1988)
 Sharon E. Sutton (born 1941), African American architect and architectural educator and Fellow of the American Institute of Architects
 Patricia Swan (1924–2012), active in Calgary, Alberta, and Denver, Colorado

T
 Hilda Taba (1902–1967), architect, theorist, and educator
 Marilyn Jordan Taylor (born 1949), partner of Skidmore, Owings & Merrill, founder of Transport and Airport Design Division
 Jane Thompson (1927–2016), principal of Thompson Design Group
 Martha Cassell Thompson (1925–1968), African American architect and chief restoration architect for the National Cathedral
 Polly Povey Thompson (1904–1994), early 20th-century American architect, principal in the firm Polly Povey Thompson, Ray Kermit Thompson, Architects
 Martha Thorne (born 1953), educator, curator, writer, executive director of the Pritzker Prize
 Olive Tjaden (1904–1997) the only woman member of the American Institute of Architects for many years.
 Billie Tsien, Tod Williams (born 1943) Billie Tsien (born 1949) partner, Tod Williams Billie Tsien Architects
 Anne Tyng (1920–2011), close collaborator of Louis Kahn

V
 Margaret Van Pelt Vilas (1905–1995), opened a practice in New Haven, Connecticut in 1958
 Shirley Jane Vernon (1930–2011), architect and architectural educator in Pennsylvania, was a Fellow of the AIA
 Lauretta Vinciarelli (1943–2011), artist, architect, and architectural educator

W
 Roberta Washington, founded one of the few architecture firms led by an African American
 Hazel Wood Waterman (1865–1948), worked in Arts and Crafts style in Southern California
 Nelva Weber (1908–1990), landscape architect in New York City
 Jane Weinzapfel, co-founder of the Boston-based firm Leers Weinzapfel Associates
 Marion Weiss (born 1957), co-founder of Weiss/Manfredi, and Professor of Architecture at the University of Pennsylvania
 Candace Wheeler (1827–1923), interior designer
 Sarah Whiting (born 1964), academic and author
 Bertha Yerex Whitman (1892–1984), first female architecture graduate from the University of Michigan, active in Illinois
 Elizabeth Whittaker, founder of Merge Architects in Boston and professor at Harvard University's Graduate School of Design
 Leila Ross Wilburn (1885–1967), one of the first female architects in Georgia
 Emily Williams (1869–1942), pioneering female architect in San Jose, California and San Francisco
 Beverly Willis (born 1928), influential in design development, active mainly in San Francisco
 Alda Heaton Wilson (1873–1960), architect and civil engineer from Iowa
 Zelma Wilson (1918–1996), active mainly in California
 Marjorie Wintermute (1919–2007), active in Oregon
 Catherine Bauer Wurster (1905–1964), architect and urban social activist

Y
 Georgina Pope Yeatman (1902–1982), active in Philadelphia
 Florence Yoch (1890–1972), landscape architect active in California
 Meejin Yoon (born 1972), Korean-American architect and designer, co-founder of Höweler+Yoon
 Helen Binkerd Young (1877–1959), early New York architect and architectural educator

Z
 Astra Zarina (1929–2008), architect and academic
 Zoka Zola, Croatian-born American architect, active in Chicago since 1990

South America

Argentina
 Diana Agrest (born 1945), co-founded Agrest and Gandelsonas Architects in New York City
 Cristina Álvarez Rodríguez (born 1967), various administrative positions
 Alicia Cazzaniga (1928–1968), best known for designing the National Library of the Argentine Republic
 Noemí Goytia (born 1936), Argentine architect, professor
 Sara Gramática (born 1942), co-founded GGMPU Arquitectos in Córdoba, Argentina
 Mabel Lapacó (1930–2016), Brutalist architect
 Martha Levisman (born 1933), architect and archivist
 Zaida Muxí (born 1964), architect, city planner
 Filandia Elisa Pizzul (1902–1987), first female architecture graduate in Argentina
 Graciela Silvestri (born 1954), architect, educator, researcher
 Susana Torre (born 1944), feminist with academic and practical experience, strong supporter of women's role in architecture
 Itala Fulvia Villa (1913–1991), Buenos Aires urban planner
 Marina Waisman (1920–1997), Premio América laureate in 1987

Brazil
 Lina Bo Bardi (1914–1992), Italian-born Brazilian modernist architect
 Georgia Louise Harris Brown (1918–1999), African American who spent most of her career in Brazil
 Carla Juaçaba (born 1976), received the first arcVision prize for Women and Architecture
 Lota de Macedo Soares (1910–1967), self-taught architect and landscape architect emeritus, created the Parque do Flamengo, RJ

Chile
 Sophia Hayden (1868-1953), the first female graduate of the four-year program in architecture at MIT. 
 Glenda Kapstein Lomboy (1939–2008), architect who won the 2003 PLEA Lifetime Achievement Awards for "sustainable architecture and urban design"
 Joan MacDonald (born 1941), Deputy Ministre of Housing and Urbanism in Chile from 1990 until 1994
 Margarita Pisano (1932–2015), architect, writer, and feminist theorist
 Dora Riedel (1906–1982), the first Chilean woman to receive a degree in architecture
 Rocio Romero (born 1971), Chilean born prefabrication, kit home designer
 Sonia Tschorne (born 1954), architect and Minister of Housing, Urban Development and National Assets from 2004 until 2006

Colombia
 Luz Amorocho (1922–2019), first woman to graduate with a degree in architecture in Colombia; Director of Planning at the National University of Colombia, 1966–1988
 Diana Pombo (1952-2016), environmentalist, architect and writer.
 Emesé Ijjasz de Murcia (1936), architect specialized in social housing

Paraguay 

 Gloria Cabral (born 1982), titular partner of the firm Gabinete Arquitectura

Uruguay
 Charna Furman (born 1941), urban planning architect noted for designing urban spaces for women and marginalized groups
 Giulia Guarino (1897–1985), Italian-born architect, first woman architect in South America

See also
Women in architecture
Women of the Bauhaus

References

External links
Pioneering Women of American Architecture

 

Architects